KNMD-TV, virtual channel 5 (VHF digital channel 8), is an ATSC 3.0 Public Broadcasting Service (PBS) member television station serving Albuquerque, New Mexico, United States that is licensed to the capital city of Santa Fe. Owned by the University of New Mexico, it is a sister station to Albuquerque-licensed KNME-TV (channel 5). Both stations share studios on UNM's North Campus on University Boulevard Northeast in Albuquerque, while KNMD-TV's transmitter is located atop Sandia Crest.

History

KNMD began broadcasting in late 2004 at 200 watts on VHF channel 9. It was launched as an exclusively digital television station and is the first and only station in the Albuquerque market to have never broadcast in analog.

Signal issues
Broadcasting at only 200 watts, KNMD's signal was sometimes hard to pick up in many areas without pixelation and choppy sound. KNMD was not licensed as a low-powered TV station but originally used low power because of interference issues with KCHF which broadcasts its digital signal on channel 10 from a site near Los Alamos, New Mexico. KNMD filed an application with the FCC in 2009 to move transmission frequency to channel 8 and increase power to 5.14 kW in order to improve its signal quality and range. They were granted a permit to make the changes in October 2009. In late August 2010, the upgrades were completed, greatly improving the station's signal.

ATSC 3.0 conversion
KNMD-TV converted to ATSC 3.0 (Next Gen TV) on June 30, 2021. In preparation for this change, on February 15, World Channel began airing on KNME-TV channel 5.4, and Create debuted on 5.5. KNMD-TV simulcasts the entire KNME multiplex in ATSC 3.0 format. Prior to the conversion, KNMD received a construction permit to increase power from 5.14 kW to 16.6 kW.

Digital television

Digital channels
The station's digital signal is multiplexed:

In the new ATSC 3.0 signal, KNMD's main HD channel is on 5.4 and runs programming from the "World" public television network which airs mostly news and documentaries. Some hours are programmed locally with re-airings of recent PBS prime time shows. Locally produced programs such as New Mexico In Focus are also shown on KNMD.

KNMD had previously aired the PBS Satellite Service on channel 9.1 but on January 28, 2009 had moved PBS World from 9.2 to 9.1 and launched the how-to programming channel Create on 9.2.

References

External links
 

University of New Mexico
Television channels and stations established in 2004
2004 establishments in New Mexico
NMD-TV
Mass media in Santa Fe, New Mexico
Mass media in Albuquerque, New Mexico
ATSC 3.0 television stations